In pathology, Schaumann bodies are calcium and protein inclusions inside of Langhans giant cells as part of a granuloma.

Many conditions can cause Schaumann bodies, including:
Sarcoidosis,
Hypersensitivity pneumonitis, and
Berylliosis.
uncommonly, Crohn's disease and tuberculosis.

Etymology
These inclusions were named after Swedish dermatologist Jörgen Nilsen Schaumann.

See also
Asteroid body

References

Anatomical pathology